The John M. Winstead Houses, also known as Pleasant Hill, are three antebellum houses in Brentwood, Tennessee that were together listed on the National Register of Historic Places in 1988.

A 1988 study of Williamson County historic resources lists two buildings, each named John Winstead House, that are designated as county historic resources WM-107 and WM-108.

The house designated WM-108 comprises two log structures. The first was built as a single log pen home around 1800 by John Winstead, Sr., who was one of the first white settlers in the Williamson County area, having arrived in 1799. Around 1820, by which time Winstead had extensive land holdings and owned 10 slaves, he built a second single pen log cabin, oriented diagonally to the first cabin. Winstead, Sr., died in 1822, and his family continued to live on the property. Around 1870 the two cabins were connected by a framed-in structure. Similar construction is found in the Lamb-Stephens House and the Abram Glenn House.

It is a two-story brick central passage I-frame home that was started in 1855 and took three years to complete. It has a central-bay entrance with Greek Revival detailing, including a two-story portico with square columns topped by capitals with Doric motifs. John Winstead, Jr., lived in this home until his death in 1896, after which ownership of the home passed to a related family named Edmondson. The house is now used as the clubhouse of the Governors Club golf course. It is similar in design to the James J. Sayers House (deemed National Register-eligible but not listed due to owner objection), and the National Register-listed John Seward House, Newton Jordan House, and Thomas Holt House.

References

Houses on the National Register of Historic Places in Tennessee
Houses in Williamson County, Tennessee
Greek Revival houses in Tennessee
Single pen architecture
I-houses in Tennessee
Houses completed in 1800
National Register of Historic Places in Williamson County, Tennessee